The Ministry of Security (MINSEG) of Argentina is a ministry of the national executive power that oversees public safety and security. It co-ordinates the country's national security policy and oversees the Federal Police, the Airport Security Police, the Naval Prefecture and the National Gendarmerie, as well as the newly created Federal Council for Interior Security.

The Ministry was created in 2010 by decree of then-President Cristina Fernández de Kirchner; matters of national security had previously been part of the Ministry of Justice's portfolio. The current minister of security is Aníbal Fernández, who assumed office in 2021 under President Alberto Fernández.

Responsibilities
The responsibilities and attributions of the Ministry of Security are outlined in article 22 bis of the Ley de Ministerios, which states that it is the ministry's goal to assist the President of the Nation and the Chief of the Cabinet of Ministers in all matters pertaining to national security, the preservation of liberties, life and the patrimony of Argentina's inhabitants, as well as their rights, within the Argentine Republic's democratic framework.

List of ministers

See also
Law enforcement in Argentina
Argentine Interior Security System
Argentine Federal Police

References

External links
 
 

Security
Argentina
Argentina, Security
2010 establishments in Argentina